is the fourth studio album by Japanese rock band Rider Chips, released on November 22, 2011. It is the second album released independently through their own label.

Track listing

References

Personnel 
Yoshio Nomura – guitar
Koichi Terasawa – bass
Joe – drums
Ricky – vocals
Cher Watanabe – keyboards

External links 
Rider Chips official website 

2011 albums
Rider Chips albums